The Tavern Hall Preservation Society is a not-for-profit corporation dedicated to the preservation and upkeep of the Elisha Reynolds House (1738) in Kingston, Rhode Island. The society was founded as the Tavern Hall Club in 1911 to foster understanding and cooperation between the people of the Village of Kingston and the nearby Rhode Island State College community.

Organizational history
The Tavern Hall Preservation Society was founded in 1911 as the Tavern Hall Club by Robert A. Lichtenthaeler and four other professors from Rhode Island State College at the Hagar House on Old North Road in Kingston, Rhode Island to foster understanding and cooperation between the people of the Village of Kingston and the community of students, faculty, administrators and staff at the college.  The name of the club was derived from the fact that from 1911 to 1919 the club met at the no longer extant Joseph Reynolds' Tavern in the west end of the Caleb Wescott House  in Kingston. The club was first registered as a corporation with the Secretary of State of Rhode Island on 23 March 1914 with its charter president, Robert A. Lichtenthaeler and the charter board of directors Frank H. Bills, Wilbur E. Dove, George E. Merkle, Lawrence S. Crosby, and Roy B. Cooley as signatories.

The Tavern Hall Club has been the institutional sponsor of Boy Scout Troop 1, Kingston, since its founding in 1923.  Troop 1 is now one of the oldest continuously operating boy scout troops in America.  From its earliest days, the Tavern Hall Club has served the community by providing educational programs and social activities for residents of Kingston.

In 1994, the membership voted unanimously to amend the constitution to admit women as full members, and in 1996, the first woman president of the club, Elizabeth L. Indeglia, was elected.

Beginning in 2004, the Tavern Hall Club was superseded by the Tavern Hall Preservation Society through incorporation as a 501-(c)3 not-for-profit corporation dedicated to the preservation of its meeting house, built in 1738 by Elisha Reynolds (1706-1791).  Reynolds served as a colonel in the militia and was a judge of the Court Martial during the French and Indian War, and was a signatory on the Charter of Brown University in 1768.  The Reynolds House is one of the oldest continuously occupied buildings in the village of Kingston.

The year 2011 was marked by a centennial celebration by the society.

Elisha Reynolds House (1738)
 The Tavern Hall Club purchased the Elisha Reynolds House  in 1919 to serve as its meetinghouse, located at 1800 South Road on the corner of Kingstown Road (Route 138).   Over the years in addition to being the home of Col. Elisha Reynolds, the house served as the home of Elisha Reynolds Potter (1764–1835), Reynolds's grandson, who served as the Speaker of the Rhode Island House of Representatives and became a U.S. Congressman. It was also one of several homes owned by Potter's son Elisha Reynolds Potter, Jr. (1811–1882) who was a Justice of the Rhode Island Supreme Court, and also a U.S. Congressman like his father.

During the Revolution, the house was used as a meeting place for the 3rd Kings County Regiment of the Rhode Island militia (known as the Kingston Reds), that was formed in May 1779 under the command of Col. Thomas Potter.  On 5 March 1781, Col. Potter served as host of General George Washington and his officers in the house on a final stop on their famed journey to confer with General Rochambeau in Newport, Rhode Island where the two commanding generals possibly planned Rochambeau's mobilization and the decisive Siege of Yorktown.

In 1785, the ground floor of the house was used as a residence and general store by the name of West India Store operated by storekeeper Thomas R. Wells, whose son Thomas Robinson Wells (1785-1853) married Maria Potter (1791-1831).   The house later served as the home of South Kingstown's first newspaper The Rhode Island Advocate published by James Brenton in 1832.  It was succeeded in 1854 by the South County Journal, which was renamed to become the Narragansett Times in 1864. For a short time from 1838-42, the house was owned by the Kingston Boot and Shoe Company, but the house was reacquired by Justice Potter in payment for outstanding debts on the mortgage.  The house was then transferred to Justice Potter's brother Thomas Mawney Potter in 1843, and it remained in the Potter family until its sale to the Tavern Hall Club on 15 March 1919 by Carroll Potter.

In the summer 1872, the house was rented to Austrian opera star Pauline Lucca and her retinue during her two-year concert tour in the United States and while she was in the beginning of a bitterly contested divorce.  In 1882, Dr. Thomas Mawney Potter established a boarding house for women in the building, and in 1885, sisters Orpha and Elizabeth Rose established a millinery and women's clothing store famous for its worsted goods in a room on the ground floor.  At the same time, the Rose sisters served as librarians for books held at the house that eventually became the nucleus of the book collection of the Kingston Free Library, which was later established in the mid-1890s at the Old King's County Courthouse in Kingston after the Washington County Courthouse was built in 1892. Upon the sale of the Reynolds House to the Tavern Hall Club in 1919, the building was used to house male members of the club.  Later on, visitors to Kingston, including students attending Rhode Island State College (now the University of Rhode Island) stayed at the house.  Additionally, in the 19th century and early decades of the 20th century it was used as a meeting place for the volunteer fire brigade of the village.  The parlor and billiard room of the Reynolds House have been used since 1919 as the meeting place for the club and the boy scout troop since 1923, and as a venue for club-sponsored billiards tournaments.

In 1959, the house was designated as part of the Kingston Village Historic District by the Town of South Kingstown, and in 1974, it was placed on the National Register of Historic Places as part of the Kingston Historic District.

References
Notes

Citations

See also

History of Rhode Island
Landmarks in Rhode Island
Houses in South Kingstown, Rhode Island